Falmouth Marathon may suggest:

 The Cape Cod Marathon, held in Falmouth, Massachusetts
 The Falmouth Road Race, a shorter race also held in Falmouth, Massachusetts